Emigrant Pass may refer to:
Emigrant Pass (Nevada), a mountain pass carrying Interstate 80 over the Emigrant Hills of northern Eureka County, Nevada
Emigrant Pass (Oregon), in the Cascade Mountains
Emigrant Pass (Lassen Volcanic National Park), a California crossing of the Nobles Emigrant Trail
Emigrant Pass (Tahoe National Forest), a California Sierra Crest crossing used for the Western States Endurance Run
Emigrant Pass (Emigrant Wilderness), West Walker River route over the California Sierra Crest
Emigrant Pass (Death Valley), a site on the path of the Death Valley '49ers
Emigrant Pass (Nopah Range), a mountain pass in Inyo County, California
Emigrant Gap, a California Trail crossing on the west Sierra slope near the Emigrant Gap, California community named for the crossing

See also
 Emigrant, for passes (documents and permissions)